George Tully (29 August 1914 – 8 September 1986) was a Canadian fencer. He competed in five events at the 1936 Summer Olympics.

References

1914 births
1986 deaths
Canadian male fencers
Olympic fencers of Canada
Fencers at the 1936 Summer Olympics
Fencers from Montreal